Lasma Liepa (born 4 July 1988) is a Latvian-born Turkish female sprint kayaker. She is a member of  Antalya Gençlik Merkezi GSK in Antalya.

In 2015, she received the Turkish citizenship, and was admitted to the Turkey national canoe team. According to the Turkish Canoe Federation, the main factor for Liepa's transfer to Turkey was supposedly her age seen by the Latvian sports officials not suitable anymore for canoeing.

She took part at the 2015 ICF Canoe Sprint World Championships in Milan, Italy, and finished 12th. Upon this result, she earned a quota spot for the women's K-1 200 m event at the 2016 Summer Olympics. She is the first ever women's canoeist to represent Turkey at the Olympics.

References

1988 births
Sportspeople from Riga
Kayakers
Latvian female canoeists
Latvian emigrants to Turkey
Naturalized citizens of Turkey
Turkish female canoeists
Living people
Canoeists at the 2016 Summer Olympics
Olympic canoeists of Turkey
Competitors at the 2018 Mediterranean Games
Latvian Academy of Sport Education alumni
European Games competitors for Turkey
Canoeists at the 2015 European Games
Canoeists at the 2019 European Games
Mediterranean Games competitors for Turkey